José Francisco "Pepe" Mora Altava (born 11 June 1981 in Castellón de la Plana, Valencian Community) is a Spanish former professional footballer who played as a central defender.

External links

1981 births
Living people
Sportspeople from Castellón de la Plana
Spanish footballers
Footballers from the Valencian Community
Association football defenders
Segunda División players
Segunda División B players
Tercera División players
CD Castellón footballers
FC Barcelona Atlètic players
Recreativo de Huelva players
Hércules CF players
Deportivo Alavés players
CD Eldense footballers